The Mysteries of Paris (French: Les Mystères de Paris) is a French-Italian film from 1962, set in Paris. It was directed by André Hunebelle, written by Diego Fabbri  and Pierre Foucaud, starring Jean Marais. The scenario was written on the basis of the novel Les Mystères de Paris. It has several precursors including The Mysteries of Paris (1912), The Mysteries of Paris (1935).

Cast 
 Jean Marais as Rodolphe de Sambreuil, lover of Irène
 Raymond Pellegrin as Baron de Lansignac, the enemy of Rodolphe
 Jill Haworth as Marie Godin
 Dany Robin as Irène
 Pierre Mondy as Chourineur
 Georges Chamarat as Jérôme Foulon
 Noël Roquevert as Mr. Pipelet, the concierge
 Jean Le Poulain as The Teacher
 Renée Gardès as the Owl
 Alain Decock as the young person Fanfan Morel
 Robert Dalban as the boss of the inn of the Destructives
 Paulette Dubost as Mrs Pipelet, the concierge
 Benoîte Lab as Louise Morel, the woman of the suit
 Gabriel Gobin as Mr. Morel, the suit
 Madeleine Barbulée as Mrs Godin
 Maria Meriko as Mrs Georges
 Charles Bouillaud as Mr. Godin
 Raoul Billerey as Amédée
 Guy Delorme as policeman
 Jacques Sablon

See also 
 List of highest-grossing films in the Soviet Union

References

External links

1962 films
1960s French-language films
Films set in Paris
Films set in the 1840s
1960s historical drama films
French historical drama films
Italian historical drama films
Films directed by André Hunebelle
1962 drama films
1960s French films
1960s Italian films